Cochrane–Orcutt estimation is a procedure in econometrics, which adjusts a linear model for serial correlation in the error term. Developed in the 1940s, it is named after statisticians Donald Cochrane and Guy Orcutt.

Theory
Consider the model

If it is found, for instance via the Durbin–Watson statistic, that the error term is serially correlated over time, then standard statistical inference as normally applied to regressions is invalid because standard errors are estimated with bias. To avoid this problem, the residuals must be modeled. If the process generating the residuals is found to be a stationary first-order autoregressive structure, with the errors {} being white noise, then the Cochrane–Orcutt procedure can be used to transform the model by taking a quasi-difference:

In this specification the error terms are white noise, so statistical inference is valid.

Inefficiency
The transformation suggested by Cochrane and Orcutt disregards the first observation of a time series, causing a loss of efficiency that can be substantial in small samples.

Estimating the autoregressive parameter
(Note that one data point, the first, is lost in this regression.)

It has to be noted, though, that the iterative Cochrane–Orcutt procedure might converge to a local but not global minimum of the residual sum of squares. This problem disappears when using the Prais–Winsten transformation instead, which keeps the initial observation.

See also
 Hildreth–Lu estimation
 Newey–West estimator
 Prais–Winsten estimation
 Feasible generalized least squares

References

Further reading

External links
 by Mark Thoma.

Autocorrelation
Curve fitting
Regression with time series structure